Outline of intelligence may refer to:
 Outline of human intelligence
 Outline of artificial intelligence